Khutauna is a small town in the Madhubani district in northern Bihar state, India. There are 14 Ward in Khutauna block.   Khutauna is under Phulparas subdivision bearing its own post office, block. Khutauna is very near to the Indo-Nepal border.

Laukaha is a nearby town close to the border of Nepalese town of Thadi. Laukaha in India and Thadi in Nepal are a part of one of the agreed route for Mutual Trade between India and Nepal. Nepal Government of Nepal has set up a dedicated customs office in the town.
 and Government of India has set up a Land Customs Station with a Superintendent level officer.

References

Cities and towns in Madhubani district